Ernocornutia sangayana is a species of moth of the family Tortricidae. It is found in Morona-Santiago Province, Ecuador.

The wingspan is 18 mm. The ground colour of the forewings is brownish yellow with brownish strigulae (fine streaks) and lines. The hindwings are cream, mixed with brownish ochreous and strigulated with grey.

References

Moths described in 2008
Euliini
Moths of South America
Taxa named by Józef Razowski